John Carpenter (born 29 August 1948) is a former Australian rules footballer who played with Essendon in the Victorian Football League (VFL). He later played with McLeod-Rosanna, Bayswater and Oakleigh Districts.

Notes

External links 		
		

Essendon Football Club past player profile	
		
		
		

Living people
1948 births
Australian rules footballers from Victoria (Australia)		
Essendon Football Club players